MoeJadKateBarry is a 1987 EP by Moe Tucker. The title refers to Tucker and the members of her backing band. It's composed of a mixture of re-recordings of recently released outtakes from The Velvet Underground's mid years (1967-1968), covers of songs from the 1950s-1960s, (notably a 1967 song featuring writing from Velvet Underground members John Cale and Lou Reed), and a singular new composition. 

Tucker is credited as a co-writer on 3 of the EPs 5 tracks, and the featured players are all members of Half Japanese.

Track listing

Personnel
MoeJadKateBarry 
Moe Tucker - drums, backing vocals
Jad Fair - lead vocals
Kate Messer - guitar
Barry Stock - bass, lead guitar
Guest Musicians
Mark Jickling - guitar on "Hey Mr. Rain"
David Fair - harmonica on "Baby What You Want Me to Do"
John Dreyfuss - saxophone on "Jad is a Fink"

1987 EPs
Maureen Tucker albums
Covers EPs